Snafu are a British rhythm and blues/rock band, originating in the 1970s, featuring vocalist Bobby Harrison and slide guitarist Micky Moody.

The band reunited in 2019, after more than four decades of inactivity.

Discography

Albums

References

Further reading

External links

Musical groups established in 1972
Musical groups disestablished in 1975
British rhythm and blues musical groups
British funk musical groups
British rock music groups
1972 establishments in the United Kingdom
1975 disestablishments in the United Kingdom